Juan Christian Pereira Coelho (born 10 March 2001), or simply Juan Coelho, is a Brazilian professional footballer who plays for Cruzeiro on loan from Azuriz as forward .

Club career

Grêmio
Born in São Bernardo do Campo, Brazil, Juan Coelho joined the Grêmio's Academy at the age of 20 in 2021 on loan from Azuriz.

Career statistics

Club

Honours
Azuriz
Campeonato Paranaense 2ª Divisão: 2020

References

External links

2001 births
Living people
Brazilian footballers
Association football forwards
Azuriz Futebol Clube players
Grêmio Foot-Ball Porto Alegrense players
Al Hamriyah Club players
Cruzeiro Esporte Clube players
Campeonato Brasileiro Série B players
UAE First Division League players
Brazilian expatriate footballers
Brazilian expatriate sportspeople in the United Arab Emirates
Expatriate footballers in the United Arab Emirates
People from São Bernardo do Campo
Footballers from São Paulo (state)